Hamed Lak (born 24 November 1990) is an Iranian professional footballer who plays as a goalkeeper for Persian Gulf Pro League club Mes Rafsanjan.

Club career
He is a product of Saba Qom youth academy. He was promoted to the first team squad in summer 2010. He became their number one goalkeeper on 2011–12 season under Abdollah Veisi. In the summer of 2013, he moved to Tractor despite bids from Persepolis and Beşiktaş. In his first year with Tractor, Lak was instrumental in Tractor's success in the Hazfi Cup, going all the way and winning it for the first time in the club's history. In the summer of 2014 Lak extended his contract with Tractor for another two seasons.

Persepolis 
On 1 September 2020, Lak signed a two-year contract with Persian Gulf Pro League champions Persepolis.

Career statistics

Club

International career

He made his first International match for Iran national under-23 football team on June 11, 2011; in a friendly match against Syria U-23, after he was on the bench after Mohammad-Rashid Mazaheri and Saleh Khalil-Azad in 2012 Summer Olympics qualification against Kyrgyzstan.

He made his debut under Carlos Queiroz on 15 December 2012 against Yemen in 2012 WAFF. Lak put up a good performance and Iran won the game 2–1.

Lak was called up again to Team Melli for June 2017 after a long absence.

Honours

Club
Tractor
Hazfi Cup (1): 2013–14

Persepolis
Persian Gulf Pro League (1): 2020–21
Iranian Super Cup (1): 2020 ; Runner-Up (1): 2021
AFC Champions League runner-up (1): 2020

References

External links

Persian League Profile 

1990 births
Living people
Iranian footballers
Persian Gulf Pro League players
Saba players
Tractor S.C. players
Iran international footballers
Sportspeople from Tehran
Association football goalkeepers
Persepolis F.C. players
Mes Rafsanjan players
Nassaji Mazandaran players